Clanculus atropurpureus is a species of sea snail, a marine gastropod mollusk in the family Trochidae, the top snails.

Charles Hedley (Proc. Linn. Soc. N.S.Wales, 1902, p. 16) suggests, that Clanculus atropurpureus  and Clanculus samoensis Hombr. & Jacq., appear to be synonyms of Clanculus denticulatus (Gray, 1827).

Description

The height of the shell attains 7 mm, its diameter 9 mm. The depressed, umbilicate shell has  conoid shape. It is, dark purplish or ferrugineous brown, unicolored, the apex carmine. The shell contains six convex granose-lirate whorls. The sutures are narrowly subcanaliculate. The body whorl is rounded at the periphery and abruptly briefly deflected anteriorly. It is encircled by 16 or 17 finely, very regularly but feebly granose lirae, which are wider on the base. The aperture is rounded. The  outer and basal lips are regularly curved, thickened and finely crenulated within. The columella deeply enters the profound umbilicus, bearing a minute denticle above and at the base. The profound umbilicus is smooth within, bordered and constricted by a marginal rib bearing about four white teeth, the largest near to the parietal wall of the aperture.

Distribution
This marine species occurs in the Red Sea, in the Central and East Indian Ocean; off Indo-China, Indo-Malaysia, Oceania, the Philippines and Australia (Northern Territory, Queensland, Western Australia).

References

 Gould, A.A. 1849. Description of a new species of Trochus. Proceedings of the Boston Society of Natural History 3: 106-108, 118
 Rousseau, L. 1854. Voyage au Pôle Sud et dans l'Océanie sur les corvettes l'Astrolabe et la Zélée, exécuté ... pendant ... 1837-1840, sous le commandemant de M.J. Dumont d'Urville ... publié ... sous la direction supérieure de M. Jacquinot, etc. Description des mollusques, coquilles et zoophytes. Paris : Publisher unknown Vol. 5 1-132, pls 1-23.
 Smith, E.A. 1876. A list of marine shells, chiefly from the Solomon Islands, with descriptions of several new species. Journal of the Linnean Society of London, Zoology 12: 535-562, pl. 30
 Hedley, C. 1899. The Mollusca of Funafuti. Part 1. Gastropoda. Memoirs of the Australian Museum 3(7): 395-488, 49 text figs
 Melvill, J.C. & Standen, R. 1899. Report on the marine Mollusca obtained during the first expedition of Prof. A.C. Haddon to the Torres Straits in 1888-89. Journal of the Linnean Society of London, Zoology 27: 150-206, pls 1-2
 Melvill, J.C. & Standen, R. 1901. The Mollusca of the Persian Gulf, Gulf of Oman, and the Arabian Sea, as evidenced mainly through the collections of Mr. F.W. Townsend, 1893-1900; with descriptions of new species. Proceedings of the Zoological Society of London 1901(ii): 327-460 pls xxi-xxiv
 Hedley, C. 1907. The Mollusca of Mast Head Reef, Capricorn Group, Queensland, part II. Proceedings of the Linnean Society of New South Wales 32: 476-513, pls 16-21
 Schepman, M.M. 1908. Prosobranchia (excluding Heteropoda and parasitic Prosobranchia). Rhipidoglossa and Docoglossa. With an appendix by Prof. R. Bergh [Pectinobranchiata]. Siboga-Expéditie Report 49(1): 1-108, 9 pls
 Rippingale, O.H. & McMichael, D.F. 1961. Queensland and Great Barrier Reef Shells. Brisbane : Jacaranda Press 210 pp.
 Cernohorsky, W.O. 1978. Tropical Pacific marine shells. Sydney : Pacific Publications 352 pp., 68 pls
 Short, J.W. & Potter, D.G. 1987. Shells of Queensland and The Great Barrier Reef. Drummoyne, NSW : Golden press Pty Ltd 135 pp., 60 pl.
 Wilson, B. 1993. Australian Marine Shells. Prosobranch Gastropods. Kallaroo, Western Australia : Odyssey Publishing Vol. 1 408 pp. 
 Jansen, P. 1995. A review of the genus Clanculus Montfort, 1810 (Gastropoda: Trochidae) in Australia, with description of a new subspecies and the introduction of a nomen novum. Vita Marina 43(1-2): 39-62

External links
 To Biodiversity Heritage Library (12 publications)
 To Encyclopedia of Life
 To GenBank (2 nucleotides; 0 proteins)
 To World Register of Marine Species
 INternet Hawaii Shell News: Clanculus atropurpureus

atropurpureus
Gastropods described in 1849